This is a list of solar farms in South Australia. As of 2019, South Australia has 2 operating solar farms with a total installed capacity of about 328 MW.

Table

See also 

 List of power stations in South Australia

References

External links 

Solar Farms
 
Economy of Australia-related lists